Aleksandr Ivanovich Kharasakhal (born 24 September 1962) is a Russian football coach and a former player.

References

1962 births
Living people
Soviet footballers
FC Mariupol players
Russian footballers
FC Okean Nakhodka players
Russian Premier League players
Russian football managers
Association football forwards
FC Smena Komsomolsk-na-Amure players